NGC 201 is a spiral galaxy in the constellation of Cetus. It is one of the group members of HCG 7, with the other group members NGC 192, NGC 196, and NGC 197. It was discovered on December 28, 1790 by William Herschel.

See also 
 List of NGC objects (1–1000)

Image gallery

References

External links 
 
  
 SEDS

0201
0419
+00-02-115
002388
Spiral galaxies
Astronomical objects discovered in 1790
Discoveries by William Herschel
Cetus (constellation)